This is a season-by-season list of records compiled by Bemidji State in men's ice hockey.

Bemidji State has won 13 national titles at varying levels of play, appearing in 20 championship rounds (including 8 consecutive Division II championships) but has yet to win at the Division I level (as of 2019).

Season-by-season results
Note: GP = Games played, W = Wins, L = Losses, T = Ties

* Winning percentage is used when conference schedules are unbalanced.† Bemidji State was not allowed to participate in the NCHA Tournament after 1996 due to being a Division II program.

Footnotes

References

 
Lists of college men's ice hockey seasons in the United States
Bemidji State Beavers ice hockey seasons